Panachamoodu is a village in Neyyattinkara Taluk in Trivandrum district, Kerala State, India. and also sharing its border with Tamil Nadu.

See also
Neyyattinkara
Parassala
Amaravila
Vellarada

References

Villages in Thiruvananthapuram district